Lee R. Filer (born January 14, 1980, in Cheyenne, Wyoming) is an American politician and a Democratic member of the Wyoming House of Representatives representing District 12 since January 8, 2013.

Education
Filer attended the Community College of the Air Force.

Elections
2012 When Republican Representative Amy Edmonds retired and left the District 12 seat open, Filer was unopposed for the August 21, 2012 Democratic Primary, winning with 384 votes, and won the November 6, 2012 General election with 1,578 votes (48.00%) against Republican candidate David Kniseley.

References

External links
Official page at the Wyoming Legislature
 

1980 births
Living people
Community College of the Air Force alumni
Democratic Party members of the Wyoming House of Representatives
Politicians from Cheyenne, Wyoming